Saterland Frisian, also known as Sater Frisian, Saterfrisian or Saterlandic, is the last living dialect of the East Frisian language. It is closely related to the other Frisian languages: North Frisian, spoken in Germany as well, and West Frisian, spoken in the Dutch province of Friesland.

Classification
From a diachronical perspective, Saterland Frisian is an Emsfrisian dialect of the East Frisian language. Emsfrisian used to be spoken in the western half of the East Frisian peninsula and in the Ommelanden. The other East Frisian dialect group was the Weserfrisian, formerly spoken from the eastern half of the East Frisian peninsula to beyond the Weser.

Synchronically speaking, Saterland Frisian is a language. Together with West Frisian and North Frisian it belongs to the Frisian branch of the Germanic languages. The three Frisian languaes evolved from Old Frisian. Upon the living Frisian dialects, the one spoken in Heligoland (called Halunder) is the closest to Saterland Frisian. The closest language other than Frisian dialects is English.

Frisian and English used to be grouped together as Anglo-Frisian languages. Nowadays, English, Frisian and Lower German, sometimes including Dutch, are grouped together under the label North Sea Germanic. Low German, which is closely related to Saterland Frisian lacks many North Sea Germanic features from the Old Saxon times on. In turn, Saterland Frisian had prolonged close contact with Low German.

History 
Settlers from East Frisia, which left their homelands around 1100 a.D. due to natural disasters, established the Frisian language in the Saterland. Since the sparse population at the time of their arrival spoke Old Saxon, the Frisian language of the settlers came into close contact with Low German.

In East Frisia, the assimilation of Frisian speakers into the Low German speaking population was well under way in the early 16th century. The dialect of the Saterland persisted mostly due to geography: As the Saterland is surrounded by bogland, its inhabitants had few contacts with adjacent regions. The villages built on sandy hills were basically like islands. Until the 19th century, the settlement area was almost exclusively reachably by boat via the river Sagter Ems. The exception being walking on frozen or dried out bogland during times of extreme weather.

Politically, the land did not belonged to the County of East Frisia, which came into existence in the 15th century, but changed hands frequently until it became part of County of Oldenburg. There resulting border was not merely political, but also denominational, as the Saterland was recatholicized. The Saterland was linguistically and culturally different from Oldenburg, too. This led to further isolation.

Colonialization of the bogland, the construction of roads and railways led to the Saterland being less isolated. Still, Saterfrisian managed, because most of the community living in the Saterland continued to use the language. This common linguistic area was disturbed following World War II. German repatriates from Eastern Europe were settled in the Saterland, leading to Standard German gradually replacing Saterfrisian. While the predicted language death in the late 20th century did not happen and the number of speakers being stable, the Saterfrisian speaking community nowadays make up only a minority of those living in the Saterland.

Geographic distribution

Today, estimates of the number of speakers vary slightly.  Saterland Frisian is spoken by about 2,250 people, out of a total population in Saterland of some 10,000; an estimated 2,000 people speak the language well, slightly fewer than half of those being native speakers. The great majority of native speakers belong to the older generation; Saterland Frisian is thus a seriously endangered language.  It might, however, no longer be moribund, as several reports suggest that the number of speakers is rising among the younger generation, some of whom raise their children in Saterlandic.

Current revitalization efforts 
Since about 1800, Sater Frisian has attracted the interest of a growing number of linguists. Media coverage sometimes argues that this linguistic interest, particularly the work of Marron Curtis Fort, helped preserve the language and revive interest among speakers in transmitting it to the next generation. During the last century, a small literature developed in it. Also, the New Testament of the Bible was translated into Sater Frisian by Fort, who was himself a Christian.

Children's books in Saterlandic are few, compared to those in German. Margaretha (Gretchen) Grosser, a retired member of the community of Saterland, has translated many children's books from German into Saterlandic. A full list of the books and the time of their publication can be seen on the German Wikipedia page of Margaretha Grosser.

Recent efforts to revitalize Saterlandic include the creation of an app called "" (Little Sater Frisians) on Google Play. According to the app's description, it aims at making the language fun for children to learn teaches them Saterlandic vocabulary in many different domains (the supermarket, the farm, the church). There have been more than 500 downloads of the app since its release in December 2016, according to statistics on Google Play Store.

The language remains capable of producing neologisms as evidenced by a competition during the Covid-19 pandemic to create a Saterfrisian word for anti-Covid facemask held in late 2020 / early 2021 which resulted in the term "" being adopted with facemasks having the Saterfrisian sentence "" ("Under this facemask, Saterfrisian is spoken") written on them gaining some local popularity.

Official Status 
The German government has not committed significant resources to the preservation of Sater Frisian. Most of the work to secure the endurance of this language is therefore done by the Seelter Buund ("Saterlandic Alliance"). Along with North Frisian and five other languages, Sater Frisian was included in Part III of the European Charter for Regional or Minority Languages by Germany in 1998.

Dialects 
There are three fully mutually intelligible dialects, corresponding to the three main villages of the municipality of Saterland: Ramsloh, Scharrel, and Strücklingen. The Ramsloh dialect now somewhat enjoys a status as a standard language, since a grammar and a word list were based on it.

Phonology 
The phonology of Saterland Frisian is regarded as very conservative linguistically, as the entire East Frisian language group was conservative with regards to Old Frisian. The following tables are based on studies by Marron C. Fort.

Vowels

Monophthongs 
The consonant  is often realised as a vowel  in the syllable coda depending on its syllable structure.

Short vowels:

Semi-long vowels:

Long vowels:

Diphthongs

Consonants 

Today, voiced plosives in the syllable coda are usually terminally devoiced. Older speakers and a few others may use voiced codas.

Plosives

Fricatives

Other consonants

Morphology

Personal pronouns 
The subject pronouns of Saterland Frisian are as follows:

The numbers 1–10 in Saterland Frisian are as follows:

Numbers one through three in Saterland Frisian vary in form based on the gender of the noun they occur with. In the table, "m." stands for masculine, "f." for feminine, and "n." for neuter.

For the purposes of comparison, here is a table with numbers 1–10 in 4 West Germanic languages:

Vocabulary 
In Old Frisian,  and  existed ('Augustinus said and said'). Another word, common in earlier forms of Western Germanic, but survived only in East Frisian is  meaning 'knife' (comp. Seax).

Orthography 
Saterland Frisian became a written language relatively recently. German orthography cannot adequately represent the vowel rich Frisian language. Until the mid-20th century, scholars researching it developed their own orthography. The poet Gesina Lechte-Siemer, who published poems in Saterfrisian since the 1930s, adopted a proposal by the cultural historian Julius Bröring.

In the 1950s Jelle Brouwer, professor in Groningen, an orthography based on the Dutch one, which failed to gain widespread acceptance. The West Frisian Pyt Kramer, who did research in Saterfrisian, developed a phonemic orthography. The American linguist Marron Curtis Fort used Brouwer's Dutch-based orthography as a basis for his own proposal. The most notable difference between the two orthographies is the way long vowels are represented. Kramer proposes that long vowels always be spelled with a double vowels ( 'to speak'), while Fort maintains, that long vowels in open syllables be spelled with a single vowels, as Frisian vowels in open syllables are always long ( 'to speak'). Both proposals use almost no diacritics, apart from Fort's use of acutes to differentiate long vowels from semi-long ones.

So far, no standard has evolved. Those projects tutored by Kramer use his orthography while Fort published his works in his orthography, which is also recognized by the German authorities. Others use a compromise. This lack of standards leads to the village Scharrel being spelled  on its town sign instead of the currently used .

In the media 
, a German-language regional daily newspaper based in Oldenburg, Germany, publishes occasional articles in Saterland Frisian. The articles are also made available on the newspaper's Internet page, under the headline .

As of 2004, the regional radio station Ems-Vechte-Welle broadcasts a 2-hour program in Saterland Frisian and Low German entitled Middeeges. The program is aired every other Sunday from 11:00 a.m. to 1:00 p.m. The first hour of the program is usually reserved for Saterland Frisian. The program usually consists of interviews about local issues between music. The station can be streamed live though the station's Internet page.

Sample text 

Below is a snippet of the New Testament in Saterland Frisian, published in 2000 and translated by Marron Curtis Fort:

The Lord's Prayer:

Further reading 
 Fort, Marron C. (1980): Saterfriesisches Wörterbuch. Hamburg: Helmut Buske.
 Fort, Marron C. (2001) Das Saterfrisische. In Munske, Horst Haider (ed.), Handbuch des Friesischen, 409–422. Berlin: DeGruyter Mouton
 Kramer, Pyt (1982): Kute Seelter Sproakleere - Kurze Grammatik des Saterfriesischen. Rhauderfehn: Ostendorp.
 
 
 Stellmacher, Dieter (1998): Das Saterland und das Saterländische. Oldenburg.

See also

Frisia
Frisian Islands
Frisian languages
Frisians
Saterland Frisians

Notes

References

External links
 Saterfriesisches Wörterbuch (German)
 Näie Seelter Siede

East Frisian language
Endangered Germanic languages
Endangered diaspora languages